Gyrinus borealis is a species of beetle from the Gyrinidae family. The scientific name of this species was first published in 1833 by Dejean.

References

Gyrinidae
Beetles described in 1833